Dontae Richards-Kwok (born March 1, 1989) is a Canadian sprinter of Chinese-Jamaican descent. Richards-Kwok won a bronze at the 2013 World Championships in Athletics as part of the men's 4 x 100 m relay team, which also included Gavin Smellie, Aaron Brown, and Justyn Warner.

References

External links
 Athletics Canada Profile
 
 http://pridenews.ca/2015/05/21/a-track-star-in-the-making-introducing-dontae-richards-kwok/

1989 births
Black Canadian track and field athletes
Canadian male sprinters
Living people
Athletes from Toronto
York University alumni
Athletes (track and field) at the 2014 Commonwealth Games
Commonwealth Games competitors for Canada
Athletes (track and field) at the 2015 Pan American Games
Pan American Games track and field athletes for Canada